Phelan Beale Jr. (June 16, 1920 – June 26, 1993) was an American journalist and unemployment compensation law expert. He was a son of Edith Ewing Bouvier Beale and a brother of Edith Bouvier Beale whose lives were highlighted in the documentary Grey Gardens. He was a first cousin of Jacqueline Kennedy Onassis and Lee Radziwill.

Early life
Beale was born on June 16, 1920, in New York City, New York. He was the middle child of Phelan Beale Sr. and his wife Edith Ewing Bouvier Beale (known as "Big Edie"), the daughter of his father's law partner, John Vernou Bouvier Jr. Beale grew up at Grey Gardens at 3 West End Road in the wealthy Georgica Pond neighborhood in East Hampton on Long Island. Beale was known as "Phe" to his friends and family.

Beale was educated at the Westminster School for Boys in Simsbury, Connecticut. He then attended Columbia University, where he studied journalism, and was a member of the class of 1944.

Career
During World War II, Beale was drafted into the United States Army in 1942 and was sent to Camp Gruber near Braggs, Oklahoma. He served in the Pacific Theater of Operations, participating in the battles of Saipan and Okinawa. Beale was wounded in action and received two bronze battle stars and a Purple Heart for his service.

Public service career
Beale was employed with the Oklahoma Employment Security Commission in Tulsa and Oklahoma City for 30 years. Following his retirement from the commission, he consulted on unemployment compensation law.

Writing career
Beale was well known as an accomplished speaker and writer. He delivered speeches to numerous organizations on a variety of subjects and wrote magazine and newspaper articles. Throughout his writing career, Beale won hundreds of writing contests. He later appeared in television commercials for MCI Communications.

Personal life
Beale married Rosella Ramsey on December 26, 1942, in Tulsa, Oklahoma. He and Rosella met at a United Service Organizations dance in Tulsa in 1942 and eloped two weeks later. They had one daughter, Michelle Beale.

Beale was an American Kennel Club-licensed dog judge and toured the United States judging obedience trials. He enjoyed fishing in Galveston, Texas.

Grey Gardens
In 1971, Beale wrote "The Maysley Brothers — is that their name?," an article that appeared in The Capital Times of Madison, Wisconsin. In the article, he deplores the attention accorded his mother and sister at that time: "Such heartbreak and degradation…not the best publicity in the world for the family." He noted that he would see Grey Gardens "out of curiosity." Beale's younger brother Bouvier sent him the documentary's reviews, which Beale expressed made him decidedly unhappy about "those two people (who) made the movie." In the article, Beale reminisced about "the entertainment, the parties" at the Grey Gardens estate and his sister's coming out party at the Ritz-Carlton in New York City. He referred to all these activities as "all that Great Gatsby stuff." He wrote that his father refused his mother alimony and that there was a trust fund but that "trying to keep up that white elephant Grey Gardens is what ruined it."

References

1920 births
1993 deaths
20th-century American journalists
20th-century American writers
American civil servants
American freelance journalists
American male journalists
Beale family
Bouvier family
Columbia College (New York) alumni
Journalists from New York City
Journalists from Oklahoma
Military personnel from New York City
People from East Hampton (town), New York
United States Army personnel of World War II
Westminster School (Connecticut) alumni
Writers from Manhattan
Writers from Oklahoma